Abanoquil (INN) is an α1-adrenergic receptor antagonist.

See also 
 Alpha blocker

References 

Alpha-1 blockers
Quinolines
Norsalsolinol ethers